Donya is a 2003 Iranian movie directed by Manuchehr Mosayeri. It focuses on the relationship between a woman who has just returned to Iran from abroad and a conservative man.

Cast
Hediyeh Tehrani - Donya Shadab
Mohamad Reza Sharifinia - Reza Enayat
Gohar Kheirandish - Reza's wife
Farajollah Golsefidi - Naser
Soroosh Goodarzi - Mohsen
Elham Hamidi - Shadi
Majid Moshiri

External links
 

2003 films
2003 comedy-drama films
Iranian comedy-drama films